Greatest Hits is a greatest hits album by American rock musician Lenny Kravitz, released on October 24, 2000.

Background
The album features an unreleased track for promotion called "Again" which became a hit, reaching number 4 on the Billboard Hot 100, following a very successful string of hits from the album 5. "Again" propelled the compilation to commercial success greater than any of his studio efforts.

Kravitz reported in an interview for VivaMusic.com that the selection of the songs were led by his record company, Virgin Records, which only chose the songs that were successful on the charts. The tracks were sequenced by Kravitz's engineer, Henry Hirsch.

The album reached number 2 on the Billboard 200 and number 12 on the UK Albums Chart.

This album has been released with the Copy Control protection system in some regions.

Promotion
"Again" was released as the promotional single for this compilation, along with a music video. The single reached number four on the US Billboard Hot 100, becoming Kravitz's highest-charting song since "It Ain't Over 'Til It's Over".

Reception
Stephen Thomas Erlewine of AllMusic commented "Lenny Kravitz's greatest gift is that he's a master synthesist, pulling together different sounds and styles from eras past to create a sound that isn't necessarily blazingly original, but fresh due to his craft and sheer mastery of the studio. Since he was an unabashed classicist, his records often suffered the brunt of nasty criticism, but they were often very good, particularly early in his career before he indulged in the mannerisms of guitar-blasting stadium rock... After all, it doesn't just have all the main songs, it also illustrates that he indeed is a master synthesist."

Track listing

Original edition

Japanese edition
The Japan release has the song "Is There Any Love in Your Heart" appended as track 12. The tracks otherwise remained the same.

Greatest Hits: Limited Tour Edition
On November 8, 2005, the album was re-released due to Kravitz's 2005 tour, including the songs "Dig In" and "Where Are We Runnin'?", from his then-latest albums, Lenny and Baptism respectively.

DVD

Personnel
 Lenny Kravitz – vocals and lead guitar
 Craig Ross – rhythm guitar
 Cindy Blackman – drums
 Tony Breit – bass guitar

Charts

Weekly charts

Year-end charts

Decade-end charts

Certifications

References

2000 greatest hits albums
2005 video albums
Lenny Kravitz albums
Albums produced by Lenny Kravitz
Music video compilation albums
Virgin Records compilation albums
Virgin Records video albums